What Remains Inside a Black Hole is a Man or Astro-man? compilation album. It features tracks that originally appeared on 7" EPs. It was released in Australia on Au-Go-Go Records and remains difficult to find in the US. In 2001, Estrus Records released a compilation entitled Beyond the Black Hole, which features many of the same songs.

Track listing
"The Universe's Only Intergalactic Radioactive Breakfast Bar" – 1:53charles
"The Quatermass Phenomenon" – 2:56
"Eric Estrotica (Live in Space)" – 3:26
"War of the Satellites" (The Ventures) – 2:07
"Rovers" – 2:11
"24 Hours" – 2:20
"Squad Car (Live in Space)" (Eddie & the Showmen) – 2:05
"Surf Terror" – 2:55
"Transmissions from Venus" – 2:38
"Reverb 1000" – 2:08
"Caffeine Trip" – 2:52
"Polaris" – 3:23
"Adios Johnny Bravo" – 3:36
"The Vortex Beyond" – 2:23
"Within a Martian Heart" – 1:46

References

Man or Astro-man? albums
1996 compilation albums
Au Go Go Records compilation albums